Saigawa (written: 犀川) may refer to:

, former town in Miyako District, Fukuoka Prefecture, Japan
, dam in Ishikawa Prefecture, Japan